Pe may refer to:
 Physical education

Language, and letters
 Pe language
 Pe (Cyrillic), a letter (П) in the Cyrillic alphabet
 Pe (Semitic), a letter (פ ,ف, etc.) in several Semitic alphabets
 Pe (Persian), a letter (پ) in the Arabic alphabet
 Pe (Armenian), a letter (Պ պ) in the Armenian alphabet

Mathematics, science, and technology
 Weierstrass p (also called "pe"), a mathematical letter (℘) used in Weierstrass's elliptic functions and power sets
 Péclet number (abbreviated "Pe."), a dimensionless number used in physics
 Pe (text editor), a text editor for BeOS
 Petlyakov, Russian aircraft design bureau
 Pulmonary emphysema, a lung disease
 Pulmonary embolism, a medical condition
 Portable Executable, a Microsoft Windows executable file format
 Provider edge router, an edge network router
 Polyethylene, a type of plastic

Places
 Pe (city), Ancient Egyptian city that merged into Buto
 Pe, Tibet, a town on the Yarlung Tsangpo River
 .pe, the Internet country code top-level domain (ccTLD) for Peru
 Port Elizabeth, South Africa (sometimes called P.E.)
 Prince Edward Island, Canada (postal abbreviation PE)

See also
PE (disambiguation)
Pi (disambiguation)
Pee (disambiguation)